(1501 – September 17, 1564) was a Japanese samurai of the Sengoku period, who served the Matsudaira clan of Mikawa Province.

A Naito Kiyonaga died fighting in the Battle of Nagashino.

References

Samurai
1501 births
1564 deaths
Naitō clan